South Oxfordshire is a local government district in the ceremonial county of Oxfordshire, England. Its council is temporarily based outside the district at Abingdon-on-Thames pending a planned move to Didcot, the district's largest town. The areas located south of the River Thames are within the historic county of Berkshire.

History
The district was formed on 1 April 1974, under the Local Government Act 1972, covering the area of six former districts, which were abolished at the same time:
Bullingdon Rural District
Henley-on-Thames Municipal Borough
Henley Rural District
Thame Urban District
Wallingford Municipal Borough
Wallingford Rural District
The two Wallingford districts had previously been part of the administrative county of Berkshire, whilst the other four districts had been in the administrative county of Oxfordshire. The new district was originally given the name "Wallingford District". The shadow authority elected in 1973 to oversee the transition requested a change of name to "South Oxfordshire District", which was approved by the government before the new district formally came into being in 1974.

Geography
The River Thames flows for approximately 47 miles through South Oxfordshire, forming the historic county boundary between Berkshire and Oxfordshire. It is also joined by the River Thame within the district. A characteristic of the rivers within the district is that they have wide floodplains with few houses on them so that fluvial flooding is a lesser problem than flash flooding. Towns in the district are Didcot, Henley-on-Thames, Thame, Wallingford and Watlington.

Villages
See List of civil parishes in South Oxfordshire
The larger villages in the district include:
Benson
Berinsfield
Chalgrove
Chinnor
Cholsey
Dorchester
Ewelme
Goring-on-Thames
Lewknor
Shiplake
Sonning Common
Wheatley

Population change and distribution
The 2001 Census recorded a population of just over 128,000 in the district.  This was an increase of 7% since 1991. By the 2021 Census, the figure had risen to over 149,000.

Much of the district is rural in nature, with the land in agricultural use and around 70% of the district has a green belt or AONB designation (The northeast of the district forms part of the Oxford Green Belt). 50% of the district’s population lives outside its four main towns of Didcot, Henley-on-Thames, Thame and Wallingford.

Governance

South Oxfordshire District Council is elected by the district. Prior to the May 2019 local elections the council had a strong Conservative Party majority, though following the 2019 election the council moved to No Overall Control, with the Conservatives reduced to 10 seats. The council is currently administered by a Liberal Democrat and Green Party coalition.

2019 local election results

2015 local election results

At the first elections in 1973, 62 district councillors were elected. Currently thirty-six district councillors are elected from twenty one electoral wards, which cover the principal towns of Didcot, Henley, Thame and Wallingford and surrounding villages. This was a result of The South Oxfordshire (Electoral Changes) Order 2014'', effective from the 2015 local elections.

The Conservative Party held a majority on the council between 2003 and the 2019 UK local elections, when the Liberal Democrats became the larger party. After two independent councillors changed allegiance to the Liberal Democrats and the Green Party shortly after the May 2019 election, the two parties formed a coalition, led by Liberal Democrat, Sue Cooper.

Elections

Full elections of the council take place every four years.

Prior to the May 2019 local elections the Conservative numbers on the council had been reduced from 33 to 25, after several resignations and six councillors suspended for voting against a major housing plan. Following the election the Conservatives went from a controlling majority of 18, to having no overall control, with the Liberal Democrats having 12 councillors, the Conservatives having 10 and the Green Party winning 5.

Premises
The council was initially based in various premises across the district in Henley, Thame, Wheatley, Wallingford and Didcot inherited from its predecessor authorities. In 1981 the council moved to a purpose-built headquarters on Benson Lane, Crowmarsh Gifford, near Wallingford.

On 15 January 2015, an arson attack destroyed the district council's main offices in Crowmarsh Gifford. As the fire started in the early hours of the morning there were no fatalities or injuries. Immediately after the fire, the council was temporarily based in Abingdon, in the neighbouring Vale of White Horse district. From later in 2015 until 2022 the council was based at Milton Park, sharing a building with Vale of White Horse District Council. The Council initially intended to return to Crowmarsh, but in October 2020 it was announced that both councils plan on relocating to a new building in Didcot, to be built on a site known as Didcot Gateway opposite Didcot Parkway railway station, aiming for completion in 2023. In 2022 the councils vacated Milton Park and returned to Abingdon, again on a temporary basis, whilst waiting for the Didcot Gateway scheme to be ready.

Energy consumption
In May 2006, a report commissioned by British Gas showed that housing in South Oxfordshire produced the 5th highest average carbon emissions in the country at 7,356 kg of carbon dioxide per dwelling.

References

External links

 
 Visit South Oxfordshire

 
Oxfordshire, South
Non-metropolitan districts of Oxfordshire